Beartown is a hamlet located on Beartown Road in the Town of Western in Oneida County, New York.

References

Hamlets in Oneida County, New York
Hamlets in New York (state)